Arūnas is a masculine Lithuanian given name and may refer to:

Arūnas Bižokas (born 1978), ballroom dancer 
Arūnas Bubnys (born 1961), historian and archivist
Arūnas Degutis (born 1958), politician
Arūnas Dulkys (born 1972), economist and Minister of Health
Arūnas Eigirdas (born 1953), politician
Arūnas Gelažninkas (born 1985), motocross, enduro and rally raid rider
Arūnas Jurkšas (born 1972), track and field athlete
Arūnas Klimavičius (born 1982), footballer
Arūnas Matelis (born 1961), documentary film director
Arūnas Mika (born 1970), footballer
Arūnas Mikalauskas (born 1997), basketball player 
Arūnas Pukelevičius (born 1973), footballer
Arūnas Savickas (born 1975), retired freestyle swimmer
Arūnas Valinskas (born 1966), showman, TV producer and host, and politician
Arunas Vasys (born 1943), American football player
Arūnas Visockas (born 1965), Lithuanian basketball player

Lithuanian masculine given names